Subana is a village located in Jhajjar district in the Indian state of Haryana.

Demographics
In 2011, the population was 3,164.

Religion
Majority of the residents are Hindu, with Jats being the dominant social group.

Gotras

Malhan (Dhanda)
Bhukhara

See also 
 Sarola
 Girdharpur, Jhajjar
 Khudan
 Chhapar, Jhajjar
 Dhakla, Jhajjar

References 

Villages in Jhajjar district